BAMC may refer to:

 Bay Area Medical Center
 Blue Angels Motorcycle Club
 British Airways Maintenance Cardiff
 Brooke Army Medical Center